Leiomodin 1 is a protein that in humans is encoded by the LMOD1 gene.

Function

The leiomodin 1 protein has a putative membrane-spanning region and 2 types of tandemly repeated blocks.  The transcript is expressed in all tissues tested, with the highest levels in thyroid, eye muscle, skeletal muscle, and ovary. Increased expression of leiomodin 1 may be linked to Graves' disease and thyroid-associated ophthalmopathy. [provided by RefSeq, Jul 2008].

References

Further reading